Marquis is a skyscraper in Miami, Florida, United States. It is located in northeastern Downtown, on Biscayne Bay along the west side of Biscayne Boulevard. It was topped out in March 2008.

The building currently stands as the 5th tallest building in Miami and the state of Florida, behind the Panorama Tower, the Four Seasons Hotel Miami, the Southeast Financial Center, and One Thousand Museum.  The building is located across from Museum Park in northern downtown on Biscayne Boulevard between Northeast 11th Street and 12th Street, adjacent to the Eleventh Street Metromover Station.

Levels 1–3 are used by retail & the hotel. Floors 5–14 are used for parking, hotel units and amenities, and floors 15–64 contain residential units.  Floors 65-67 contain the upper levels of the penthouses on the 64th level.  Many of these penthouses are three or four levels.

Gallery

See also
List of tallest buildings in Miami
 Downtown Miami
 List of tallest buildings in Florida

References

External links
Marquis Miami on Skyscrapercenter
Marquis Miami on Emporis

Residential buildings completed in 2009
Residential skyscrapers in Miami
2009 establishments in Florida
Skyscraper hotels in Miami
Arquitectonica buildings